International Institute for Industrial Environmental Economics, often called IIIEE was established in 1995. The Institute is part of Lund university, but is governed by a Board appointed by the Swedish Government and Lund University. IIIEE is  situated in the center of Lund, Sweden.

The Institute educates through two MSc programmes Master of Environmental Management and Policy and the Erasmus Mundus programme Master of Environmental Sciences, Policy and Management. To date about 350 students from 80 countries have graduated from the programmes. Former students are active in an Alumni Network which holds bi-annual network meetings.

Research areas include Sustainable Consumption and Production; Sustainable Product and Service Systems, Energy for Sustainable Development and Policies and Systems for Sustainable Buildings

External links
 IIIEE

Lund University